The Rugby League Journal is a British rugby league periodical that is published quarterly. It was founded in 2002.

The magazine is based in Egremont, near Whitehaven in Cumbria "for fans who don't want to forget" the game as it was prior to the arrival of Super League. Its editor is Harry Edgar, the founder of Open Rugby (now Rugby League World).

Much of its contents are pictures and comment from the post-Second World War era, 1950s-1970s and includes obituaries of some of rugby league's stars of those decades. It sells for £2.95 per issue.

References

External links
 Official website

Magazines established in 2002
Quarterly magazines published in the United Kingdom
Rugby football magazines
Rugby league mass media
Rugby league in the United Kingdom
Sports magazines published in the United Kingdom